Lingkaran Trans Kota Holdings Berhad is the highway concessionaries or Build-Operate-Transfer (BOT) operator company in Malaysia. Litrak is publicly listed on Bursa Malaysia and is significantly owned by Gamuda Group.

History 
The company was founded in 1995 known as Lingkaran Trans Kota Sdn Bhd (Litrak).

List of the members company

See also 
 PROPEL Berhad
 PLUS Expressway Berhad
 ANIH Berhad
 Prolintas
 Teras Teknologi (TERAS)
 Malaysian Expressway System
 Transport in Malaysia
 List of toll roads

External links
 Litrak Group

1995 establishments in Malaysia
Companies listed on Bursa Malaysia
Expressways company of Malaysia